James Frederick Hogshire (born 1958 in Indianapolis, Indiana) is a counterculture author of magazine articles, short stories, and a number of books. His works have been published in such magazines as Harper's, Gentleman's Quarterly, Details, Esquire, CovertAction Quarterly, Omni, FAIR, The Animal's Agenda, and Lies of Our Times.

As of 2010, he was living in Seattle, Washington.

In 1993, one of Hogshire's infamous prank calls, "Bacon and Eggs", was made into a short film starring Linda Blair and Bill Pullman.

In 2006, a movie adaptation of his non-fiction guide You Are Going to Prison was released by Universal Studios as Let's Go to Prison. The movie stars Will Arnett and was directed by Bob Odenkirk.

In 2009 Feral House released an updated version of Hoghire's book Opium for the Masses.

One of Hogshire's better known short stories "The Electric Cough-Syrup Acid Test" was excerpted by Harper's and has also appeared in the book White Rabbit, and a book about zines.  The story first appeared in Hogshire's zine, Pills-a-Go-Go.

A cover article by Jim Hogshire titled "Animals and Islam" appears in The Animals Agenda, October 1991

Hogshire was a writer for the tabloid "National Examiner" between 1990–1991, and often used the pseudonym "Chet Antonini."

Hogshire attended Indiana University in Bloomington, Indiana between 1976–1980.

Partial bibliography 
 You Are Going to Prison. Loompanics Unlimited. 1994. 
 Opium for the Masses: A Practical Guide to Growing Poppies and Making Opium. Loompanics Unlimited. 1994. . Reprinted by Feral House. 2009. 
 Pills-A-Go-Go: Fiendish Investigation into Pill Marketing, Art, History, and Consumption. Feral House. 1999. 
 Sell Yourself to Science: The Complete Guide to Selling Your Organs, Body Fluids, Bodily Functions and Being a Human Guinea Pig. Loompanics Unlimited. 1992. 
 Grossed-Out Surgeon Vomits Inside Patient!: An Insider's Look at the Supermarket Tabloids. Feral House. 1997.

References

External links

 Jim Hogshire in Harper's Magazine
 Jim Hogshire and the 1st Amendment
 

American short story writers
Living people
1958 births
Writers from Indianapolis
20th-century American writers
21st-century American writers